This is a list of players with the most goals in a football game. The list only includes players who have scored the most multiple goals in first class or fully professional matches for country or club.

The current world record for an international is held by Archie Thompson, who scored 13 goals against American Samoa in Australia's 31–0 victory during the 2002 FIFA World Cup qualification. David Zdrilic scored 8 goals.

In November 2022, Shokhan Nooraldin Salihi scored 15 goals in the match of Al-Hilal against Sama in the 2022–23 Saudi Women's Premier League. In this match, Al-Hilal beat Sama 18-0. She broke the previous record of Hacène Lalmas and Malika-e-Noor for most goals in any top-flight match with 14 each.

In the most prolific European football leagues, the Premier League (and the Football League First Division before it), La Liga, Serie A and the Bundesliga, the top scorers per game have much lower tallies: seven in England and Spain and six in Italy and Germany. The last player in these leagues to score seven goals in a match was László Kubala in 1952 for FC Barcelona.

List 
The players are listed by number of goals scored in an individual game. Players on equal goals are listed in chronological order.

Continental

World 
The most successful scorers per game in a UEFA or CONMEBOL club competition match:

Domestic

Algeria

Australia 
The most successful scorers per game in a men's national league match:

The most successful scorers per game in an FFA Cup match:

Austria 
The most successful scorers per game in an Austrian Bundesliga match:

Bangladesh 
The most successful scorers per game in a domestic championship match:

Belgium 
The most successful scorers per game in a Belgian First Division match:

Brazil 
The most successful scorers per game in a domestic championship match:

Chile 
The most successful scorer per game in a Chilean Primera División match:

Colombia 
The most successful scorers per game in a Colombian Categoría Primera A match:

England 
The most successful scorers per game in a Football League match:

The most successful scorers per game in a Premier League match:

The most successful scorers per game in an FA Cup match:

France 
The most successful scorers per game in a Ligue 1 match:

Germany 
The most successful scorers per game in a Bundesliga match:

The most successful scorers per game in a 2. Bundesliga match:

The most successful scorers per game in a DDR-Oberliga match:

The most successful scorers per game in a German Cup match:

The most successful scorers per game in a Women's Fußball-Bundesliga match:

Italy 
The most successful scorers per game in a Serie A match:

Japan 
The most successful scorers per game in an J League match:

Netherlands 
The most successful scorers per game in an Eredivisie match:

The most successful scorers per game in an Eerste Divisie match:

Norway 
The most successful scorers per game in a Tippeligaen match:

Pakistan 
The most successful scorers per game in a Pakistani women's football championship match:

Portugal 
The most successful scorers per game in a Primeira Liga match:

Qatar 
The most successful scorers per game in a Qatar Stars League match:

Romania 
The most successful scorers per game in a Liga I match:

The most successful scorers per game in a Liga I Feminin match:

Scotland 
The most successful scorers per game in a top flight match:

The most successful scorers per game in a Scottish Premier League match:

The most successful scorers per game in a Scottish Cup match:

The most successful scorers per game in a Scottish Women's Cup match:

The most successful scorers per game in a Scottish Women's Premier League match:

Spain 
The most successful scorers per game in a La Liga match:

The most successful scorers per game in a Copa del Rey match:

United States 
The most goals scored per game in a Major League Soccer match:

The most goals scored per game in a NWSL match:

See also 
List of world association football records

References 

Goalscorers
Association football records and statistics